is a group of retail and financial services companies based in Chiba, Japan, which is centered on ÆON Co., Ltd. It has sister companies in Mainland China, Hong Kong, Malaysia, Indonesia, Thailand, Vietnam and Cambodia. The group also trades under the JUSCO name. It is Japan's largest retail group.

In 2011, it reported revenue of 1.2 trillion yen for the preceding year.

A decade later, its revenue rose to 8.6 trillion yen (USD $81.1 billion).

Fair trade

Aeon sells chocolate bearing the Fair Trade label under its Top Value brand.

See also
Æon
JUSCO
Maxvalu Tokai
Ministop
Carrefour Japan
Talbots (sold in 2010)
Self checkout

References

External links

 Æon

 
Retail companies of Japan
Keiretsu
Financial services companies of Japan
Japanese brands